Lake Charles is a small lake in Nova Scotia’s Halifax Regional Municipality between the communities of  Dartmouth and Waverley. It is situated between Port Wallace in the south and Nova Scotia Highway 107 in the North, Nova Scotia Highway 118 in the west and 
Nova Scotia Route 318 to the east. It is the summit of the Shubenacadie Canal, where the level of the surface is 31 m above sea level.  Located in the Shubenacadie watershed, it ultimately feeds into the Bay of Fundy. However, it also feeds into Halifax Harbour through the canal locks at Shubie Park.

Lake Charles Trail
The Lake Charles Trail, part of the Trans Canada Trail, runs along the western side of the lake, from Shubie Park to the Highway 107 overpass at Route 318 in Portobello. The trail is approximately 4.39 km long, and has a crusher dust surface. The trail is used year-round and is maintained by the Halifax Regional Municipality.

Other Lake Charles in Nova Scotia
Guysborough County at

References

Lake Charles Trail
Shubenacadie Canal
 
 Soil & Water Conservation Society of Metro Halifax

Landforms of Halifax, Nova Scotia
Charles
Tourist attractions in Halifax County, Nova Scotia
Landforms of Halifax County, Nova Scotia